Sciaphila thaidanica is one of the members of the genus Sciaphila,  (a genus in the family Triuridaceae, one of the groups of  mycoheterotrophic plants,  plants that obtains food by digesting intracellular fungi, rather than by photosynthesis) It has light purple coloration with large flowers and inflorescence. It is  characterized by one of the smallest plastomes ever encountered, which at the same time are very compact. It was recently discovered in Borneo.

References

Tsukaya, H., & Okada, H. (2013). Two new species of Sciaphila Blume (Triuridaceae) from Kalimantan, Borneo, with a new record of S. thaidanica from Borneo. Systematic Botany, 38(3), 600-605.
Petersen, G., Zervas, A., Pedersen, H. Æ., & Seberg, O. (2018). Genome reports: Contracted genes and dwarfed plastome in mycoheterotrophic Sciaphila thaidanica (Triuridaceae, Pandanales). Genome biology and evolution, 10(3), 976-981.

Parasitic plants
Triuridaceae